She is a 1935 American film produced by Merian C. Cooper. Based on the 1887 novel of the same name by H. Rider Haggard, the screenplay draws on all the books in the series: the first aforementioned book, She and Allan, The Return of She and Wisdom's Daughter.

The ancient civilization of Kor is depicted in an Art Deco style with imaginative special effects. The setting is Arctic Siberia, rather than Africa, as in the first book. With music by Max Steiner, the film stars Helen Gahagan, Randolph Scott and Nigel Bruce.

It was hoped that She would follow Cooper's previous success, King Kong. Cooper had originally intended to shoot the film in color, but budget cuts by RKO forced him to shoot the film in black and white at the last minute. However, the black and white film had disappointing results at the box-office. It initially lost $180,000, although it later had a successful re-release. The film is listed in Golden Raspberry Award founder John Wilson's book The Official Razzie Movie Guide as one of the 100 Most Enjoyably Bad Movies Ever Made. It was nominated for an Academy Award for Best Dance Direction at the 8th Academy Awards.

Plot

Leo Vincey (Scott) is called from America to the family's ancestral estate in England where his dying uncle John Vincey (Samuel Hinds) and Horace Holly convince him that their ancestor, also named John Vincey, found the fountain of youth 500 years ago, but only his wife returned on the expedition.

Following the route outlined in an old journal, Leo and Holly travel through frozen wastes, as a guide named Tugmore and his daughter Tanya join them on their quest, but Tugmore perishes when he can't resist digging for gold that is frozen near a mountain privy to avalanche. They stumble upon the ancient city of Kor, where they are attacked by cannibals but are saved by She Who Must Be Obeyed and her Minister Billali.

She believes that Leo is the reincarnation of John Vincey — her lover many years ago — and vows to make him immortal like herself to rule this Shangri-La in eternal youth, as she had killed John in a fit of jealousy 500 years ago. Tanya warns Leo that nothing human can live forever. At the end, She asks Leo to step into the Flame of Life with her, so that they can become immortal, complete with trying to trick him into not noticing Tanya being used for a sacrificial ceremony, but he notices and decides to run away with her. After Leo, Holly, and Tanya find the chamber with the flame on their escape attempt, She offers to step in first in the flame. Rather than renewing her youth, She ages hundreds of years, becoming a withered mummy-like creature that dies. Leo, Holly, and Tanya then safely make their escape.

Cast
Helen Gahagan as She (Who Must Be Obeyed)
Randolph Scott as Leo Vincey
Nigel Bruce as Professor Horace Holly
Helen Mack as Tanya Dugmore
Gustav von Seyffertitz as Billali, She's mortal Governor
Lumsden Hare as Dugmore
Samuel S. Hinds as John Vincey, scientist
Noble Johnson as Amahaggar Chief

Production
In July 1932, Universal Studios announced they had bought the rights to the story.

In July 1934, RKO announced they would make the film the following year as one of the studio's big productions. Helen Gahagan's and Nigel Bruce's casting was announced in January 1935. It was Gahagan's first movie after a long theatre career. This film, along with The Last Days of Pompeii, were part of a two-picture agreement with Cooper, with the initial agreement stating that each film would be made for $1 million each. However, in pre-production, RKO informed him of their slashing of the budget, as he would now have to shoot the two films for a combined $1 million rather than $1 million each. He would later refer to the film as the "worst picture I ever made."

Athlete Jim Thorpe had a small role in the film.

Gahagan's depiction of the "ageless ice goddess" inspired the Evil Queen in Walt Disney's Snow White and the Seven Dwarfs.

Reception
Writing for The Spectator in 1935, Graham Greene reviewed the film positively, but gave a disclaimer that as "an unrepentant Haggard fan" he could not write reasonably about it. Describing the film as showcasing "earnestly manly Boy Scout virtues", Greene did acknowledge that it "bore its symbolism a little heavily", and ultimately characterized it as both thrilling and childish.

Later releases
She originally had a running time of 102 minutes, but was edited to 94 minutes for its 1949 re-release to better fit on a double bill with Cooper's The Last Days of Pompeii.

She was among the films believed lost in a fire at the RKO archives, but an original print was discovered in the garage of the silent film star Buster Keaton and was turned over to film distributor Raymond Rohauer for preservation.

In 2006, Legend Films and Ray Harryhausen colorized the film as a tribute to Cooper. The colorized trailer for She premiered at the 2006 Comic-Con.

In 2007, Kino Video produced a version that reinstated the eight minutes of scenes deleted in the 1949 re-release, drawing from a lower-quality 16mm print.

Home media

Legend Films release:
Picture Format: 1.33:1 (1080p 24fps) [AVC MPEG-4]
Soundtrack(s): English (Dolby Digital 2.0 Dual Mono)
Extras (Blu-ray):
Things to Come (1936) in colorized and black & white versions
Commentary by Ray Harryhausen and Mark Vaz on She
Interviews with Ray Harryhausen [She (1080i; 4:32)] [Things to Come (1080i; 3:47)]
Colorization Process with Ray Harryhausen [She (1080i; 8:58)] [Things to Come (1080i; 8:51)]
Extras (DVD):
The Most Dangerous Game (1932) in colorized and black & white versions
Ray Harryhausen on the Importance of a Movie Score (2:31)
James V. D'Arc, Curator of the Merian C. Cooper Papers, BYU (4:30) 
John Morgan, Composer, on Max Steiner (7:15)

See also
She: A History of Adventure
She (1965 film)
She (1982 film)

References

External links
 
 

She on Escape: July 11, 1948
 She at Legend Films

1935 films
1930s fantasy adventure films
1930s English-language films
American fantasy adventure films
American black-and-white films
Films based on multiple works
Films based on She
Films set in the Arctic
Films directed by Irving Pichel
Films scored by Max Steiner
RKO Pictures films
1930s American films